Elizabeth's Gone Raw is a vegan fine-dining restaurant in Washington, D.C. The restaurant has been named as one of the best vegan restaurants in the world.

The restaurant opened as an "occasional restaurant" in July 2010 on the second floor of a row house, serving three Friday nights per month. In September 2018 it added Saturday night service. It serves only a prix fixe seven-course tasting menu. In addition to being vegan, much of the food is also raw. The menu changes monthly.

Reception
In 2019, Big 7 Travel named them one of 50 best vegan-friendly restaurants in the world.

In 2018 Eater named them the best vegan restaurant in D.C. and Modern Farmer named them one of the 15 best vegan restaurants in the US.

In 2017 the Evening Standard named them one of the 18 best vegan restaurants in the world and Tasting Table named them one of the eight best vegan restaurants in the US.

In 2015 PETA named them one of the six best vegan fine-dining restaurants in the U.S. and BuzzFeed named them one of 24 "bucket list" vegan restaurants.

In 2014 Relish named them one of the 15 best vegan and vegetarian restaurants in the U.S.

Food & Wine listed them as one of 19 best vegetarian and vegan restaurants in the US. The Washington Post called it "an upscale vegan dinner party." Washington Life magazine called the vegan tasting menu a masterpiece. Food Network named them one of the top 20 vegan restaurants in the United States.

Gallery

See also
List of vegetarian restaurants
Raw veganism

References

Vegan restaurants in the United States
Restaurants in Washington, D.C.
Fine dining
2010 establishments in Washington, D.C.
Vegan cuisine
Restaurants established in 2010
Raw foodism